Gyula Tóth may also refer to:

 Gyula Tóth (footballer, born 1901), Hungarian footballer
 Gyula Tóth (footballer, born 1920), Hungarian footballer who played in Italy for Lucchese in 1947–1950
 Gyula Tóth (footballer, born 1941), Yugoslav football coach and goalkeeper
 Gyula Tóth (futsal player) (born 1982), Hungarian futsal player
 Gyula Tóth (runner), Hungarian marathon runner
 Gyula Tóth (water polo), Hungarian water polo coach, see Hungary women's national water polo team
 Gyula Tóth (wrestler) (1927–2001), Hungarian wrestler who won bronze medal in the 1956 Olympics